The 2014 European Le Mans Series season was the eleventh season of the Automobile Club de l'Ouest's European Le Mans Series. The five-event season began at Silverstone Circuit, in conjunction with the FIA World Endurance Championship, from 18–19 April and ended at Autódromo do Estoril on 19 October.

In the lead LMP2 class, five different teams won the five races that were held during the 2014 season. However, it was Signatech Alpine and their triumvirate of Paul-Loup Chatin, Nelson Panciatici and Oliver Webb that won the respective titles; they won the race at the Red Bull Ring, and ultimately won the championship by four points from the Jota Sport trio Filipe Albuquerque, Simon Dolan and Harry Tincknell, who won at Imola. Third place in the championship went to Le Castellet winners Gary Hirsch and Christian Klien for Newblood by Morand Racing. Other race winners included Pierre Ragues – who was part of the Hirsch-Klien Le Castellet entry – having joined the team mid-season, Sébastien Loeb Racing duo Vincent Capillaire and Jimmy Eriksson were winners at Estoril, while the opening race at Silverstone was won by Thiriet by TDS Racing, with their drivers Ludovic Badey, Tristan Gommendy and Pierre Thiriet.

In the GTE class, SMP Racing and their drivers Andrea Bertolini, Viktor Shaytar and Sergey Zlobin took their respective titles with a final round victory at Estoril while the pre-race championship leaders AF Corse, with drivers Duncan Cameron and Matt Griffin struggled in the race; having led by 21 points going into the race, Cameron and Griffin eventually lost the title by 3.5 points to Bertolini, Shaitar and Zlobin. The teams shared all five wins during the season; SMP Racing won two races, while AF Corse won three, with Cameron and Griffin being joined by Michele Rugolo for the victories; however, as Rugolo missed the Imola event, he finished six points behind them in the championship.

SMP Racing also took the honours in the GTC class, as Olivier Beretta, Devi Markozov and Anton Ladygin finished all five races on the podium – with a victory at Le Castellet – to take class honours by 15.5 points ahead of Formula Racing duo Johnny Laursen and Mikkel Mac, who won with Andrea Piccini at Imola. Third in the class championship went to another SMP Racing entry, with drivers Kirill Ladygin, Aleksey Basov and Luca Persiani, who won the race at the Red Bull Ring. Other race victories went to Team Ukraine at Silverstone with drivers Andrii Kruglyk, Sergey Chukanov and Alessandro Pier Guidi, and BMW Sport Trophy Marc VDS at Estoril, with their trio of Bas Leinders, Markus Palttala and Henry Hassid.

Regulations
The top class continued to be LMP2, where a car of 2–3 drivers had to include at least one silver or bronze-ranking driver. GTE and GTC cars had to include one bronze and silver driver or two bronze drivers. Finally, LMPC was not a part of the 2014 season. Unlike in 2013, tyre warming was allowed in the 2014 season.

Calendar
The provisional calendar was announced during the final round of the 2013 European Le Mans Series season at Circuit Paul Ricard. However, to avoid date clashes with the FIA World Endurance Championship, a revised schedule was released, with rounds 2 and 5 being moved back one week. The first round was held alongside the first round of the 2014 FIA World Endurance Championship season at Silverstone Circuit. Additionally, all races lasted an hour longer than in 2013, from three hours to four.

Entry list

The entry list was announced on February 13. It featured 42 cars, comprising 13 LMP2, 13 GTE and 16 GTC:

 LMP2 featured four Orecas (Boutsen Ginion, Sébastien Loeb, Race Performance and Murphy), three Zyteks (Greaves, Jota and Caterham), three Morgans (Pegasus, Morand and Larbre), two Alpines (Signatech) and a Ligier (Thiriet by TDS).
 GTE featured 8 Ferraris (AF Corse, AT Racing, JMW and Kessel), four Porsches (IMSA, Gulf and Crubilé) and an Aston Martin (Gulf).
 GTC featured 11 Ferraris (AF Corse, SMP, SOFREV-ASP, Formula and Ukraine), two McLarens (ART), a Porsche (Pro GT by Almeras) and a BMW (Barwell).

LMP2

LM GTE

GTC

Season results

Championship Standings

Points system

Teams Championships

LMP2

LM GTE

GTC

Drivers Championships

LMP2

LM GTE

GTC

Notes

References

External links
 

 
European Le Mans Series
Le Mans Series
European Le Mans Series seasons